The 2019 Cross River State gubernatorial election occurred on March 9, 2019. Incumbent PDP Governor Benedict Ayade won re-election for a second term, defeating APC's John Owan Enoh, and several minor party candidates.

Ayade won in all 18 LGAs of the state with a total of 73.04% of popular vote, while Enoh with no win in any LGA was his closest contestant with a total of 25.11% of popular vote having 250,323 votes less than Ayade.

Ben Ayade emerged unopposed in the PDP gubernatorial primary elections as the sole candidate, after the other candidate was disqualified. His running mate was Ivara Esu.

John Owan Enoh emerged the APC candidate in the gubernatorial primary election. His running mate was Ntufam Ekpo Okon.

Of the 26 candidates who aspired for the governorship seat, 24 were male, two were female.

Electoral system
The Governor of Cross River State is elected using the plurality voting system.

Primary election

PDP primary
The PDP primary election was held on 30 September 2018. Earlier on, Hon. Emmanuel Ibeshi, who was diequalified by the party from contesting in the primary election just about 24 hours before the exercise, sued the party and state governor for his disqualification, in court.

Candidates
Party nominee: Benedict Ayade: Incumbent governor.
Running mate: Ivara Esu
Emmanuel Ibeshi: (Disqualified)

APC primary
The Guardian and Today Nigeria reported five candidates seeking to unseat the incumbent governor. A crisis earlier developed in the state's APC party, causing it to be divided into two factions: The Etim John faction and the other faction. The Etim John faction's results were are follows: Usani Uguru Usani 47,313 votes, John Owan Enoh 1,486 votes, Eyo Etim Nyong 1,052 votes, Edem Duke 1,322 votes, and John Odey 1,099 votes. However, the official results were announced by the Chairman of Electoral Committee, Ali Magaji, pronouncing John Owan-Enoh winner with 82,272 votes out of the 101,212 votes cast. Edem Duke was said to have had 7,367 votes while Usani Usani polled 1,778 votes. There were a total of 106,212 accredited voters who cast 117 invalid votes. The elections were held on September 30, 2018.

The official results were strongly opposed by three other contestants, led by Usani, who was also rejected by the APC as a candidate. However, a court ruling affirmed Enoh as the candidate for the party.

Candidates
Party nominee: John Owan Enoh: Winner.
Running mate: Ntufam Ekpo Okon.
 Edem Duke: 1st Runner-up
 Usani Usani: 2nd Runner-up
 Eyo Etim Nyong
 John Odey

Results
A total of 26 candidates registered with the Independent National Electoral Commission to contest in the election. PDP Governor Benedict Ayade won re-election for a second term, defeating APC's Owan Enoh John (who despite being delisted by a Calabar High Court order from the elections, still had his party logo on the ballot paper), and several minor party candidates. Ayade polled 381,484 votes representing 73.04% of total vote cast, and Enoh 131,161 votes representing 25.11%. SDP's Eyo Ekpo came third with 4,818 votes representing 0.92% of total valid votes cast. The APC, however, rejected this result.

The total number of registered voters in the state was 1,486,026 while 542,115 voters were accredited. Total number of votes cast was 533,808, while total number of valid votes was 522,309. Total rejected votes were 11,499.

By local government area
Here are the results of the election from the local government areas of the state for the two major parties. The total valid votes of 522,309 represents the 26 political parties that participated in the election. Green represents LGAs won by Ayade. Blue represents LGAs won by Enoh.

References 

Cross River State gubernatorial election
Cross River State gubernatorial election
Cross River State gubernatorial elections
2019 Cross River State elections